Algal viruses are the viruses infecting photosynthetic single-celled eukaryotes, algae.  As of 2020, there were 61 viruses known to infect algae. Algae are integral components of aquatic food webs and drive nutrient cycling, so the viruses infecting algal populations also impacts the organisms and nutrient cycling systems that depend on them. Thus, these viruses can have significant, worldwide economic and ecological effects. Their genomes varied between 4.4 to 560 kilobase pairs (kbp) long and used double-stranded Deoxyribonucleic Acid (dsDNA), double-stranded Ribonucleic Acid (dsRNA), single-stranded Deoxyribonucleic Acid (ssDNA), and single-stranded Ribonucleic Acid  (ssRNA). The viruses ranged between 20 and 210 nm in diameter. Since the discovery of the first algae-infecting virus in 1979, several different techniques have been used to find new viruses infecting algae and it seems that there are many algae-infecting viruses left to be discovered

DNA viruses 

The viruses that store their genomic information using DNA, DNA viruses, are the best studied subgrouping of algae-infecting viruses This is especially true for the dsDNA virus family, Phycodnaviridae..However, other groups of dsDNA viruses including giant viruses belonging to the family Mimiviridae also infect algae. A recent survey of 65 algal genomes revealed that some viruses belonging to the Nucleocytoplasmic Large DNA Viruses (NCLDV), the larger viral group containing both the Phycodnaviridae and Mimiviridae viral families, had integrated themselves into 24 of the host’s genomes.Recently, ssDNA viruses, like the group of diatom infecting viruses Bacilladnaviridae, have been discovered

RNA viruses 

RNA viruses also attack algal hosts. There are dsRNA viruses like those belonging to the Reoviridae family that infect Micromonas pusilla and ssRNA viruses like those belonging to the genus Bacillarnavirus that infect the diatom Chaetoceros tenuissimus.Incorporation of RNA virus genes into algal genomes has also been reported.  Genes from single stranded dinoflagellate-infecting viruses have been detected in the genomes of the coral endosymbiotic algae, Symbiodinium.

References 

Viruses
Algae